Expressway 2 (E2) forms part of the Philippine expressway network. Its main route runs from Makati to Santo Tomas as South Luzon Expressway and from Santo Tomas to Batangas City as STAR Tollway. It also has spurs signed as E2 as well. South Luzon Expressway's section from Makati to Calamba, apparently as well as Skyway from Makati to Muntinlupa, is also part of AH26.

Route description

Main route

South Luzon Expressway

E2 starts at Magallanes Interchange in Makati as South Luzon Expressway. From Makati to Calamba, it is a part of Asian Highway 26 (AH26). It carries Skyway until it reaches Muntinlupa, where it ends as SLEX still continues. Differing in concession holders, its section between Magallanes and Alabang Exit is also known as Skyway At-Grade, while the rest of the section takes the South Luzon Expressway concession branding. It parallels Manila South Road (N1) from Muntinlupa to Calamba until it reaches Calamba Exit, a partial cloverleaf interchange in Calamba where N1 takes the AH26 concurrency. It continues until it reaches Santo Tomas, which ends and becomes the STAR Tollway although a spur of SLEX will continue but is currently unnumbered.

Skyway

The extent of E2/AH26 on the Skyway is unknown since the Department of Public Works and Highways's ArcGIS app does not show any route designation for the elevated tollway, although there were some E2/AH26 markers seen exclusively on Skyway Stages 1 and 2, between Buendia Exit in Makati and South Station (Alabang–Zapote) Exit in Muntinlupa, until they were dismantled together with the center barriers in 2020.

STAR Tollway

E2 continues as STAR Tollway at Santo Tomas Exit, an interchange with Maharlika Highway (N1) and SLEX in Santo Tomas, Batangas. It traverses from Santo Tomas to Batangas City, where it ends at a roundabout and four-way interchange with Jose P. Laurel Highway (N4) and Batangas Port Diversion Road (N434).

Spur routes

Muntinlupa–Cavite Expressway

Muntinlupa–Cavite Expressway is a  expressway in Muntinlupa that connects SLEX and Daang Hari Road near Bacoor, Cavite. It is currently the shortest expressway in the Philippines.

C-5 Southlink Expressway

C-5 Southlink Expressway is a spur of E2 connecting Circumferential Road 5 (N11) in Taguig to its future end at Manila–Cavite Expressway (E3) in Parañaque, with a flyover crossing above E2's main section, especially the South Luzon Expressway.

Southeast Metro Manila Expressway

Southeast Metro Manila Expressway (SEMME), also known as Skyway Stage 4, is an under construction expressway in Metro Manila and Rizal, connecting Skyway near Arca South to the Batasang Pambansa Complex in Quezon City.

See also
South Luzon Expressway
STAR Tollway

References

Roads in Metro Manila
Roads in Laguna (province)
Roads in Batangas